Ignacio "Nacho" Tinoco Jr. (November 22, 1930 – November 15, 2016) was a Professor of Chemistry at the University of California, Berkeley from 1956 to 2016.

Ignacio Tinoco received a bachelor's degree from the University of New Mexico in 1951, and a Ph.D. in physical chemistry at the University of Wisconsin, Madison in 1954. He was a postdoctoral fellow with John G. Kirkwood at Yale University from 1954 to 1956. He joined the University of California, Berkeley as a faculty member in 1956, where he was Professor in the Graduate School and a Faculty Senior Scientist, Physical Biosciences Division, Lawrence Berkeley National Laboratory. He was Chairman of the Chemistry Department (1979–82).

He is known for his pioneering work on RNA folding and the secondary structures of ribonucleic acid. His graduate and postdoctoral students include Carlos Bustamante and Frances Arnold.

His honors and awards include: Guggenheim Fellow, Medical Research Council Laboratory, Cambridge (1964); California Section Award, American Chemical Society (1965); D.Sc. University of New Mexico (1972); Member, National Academy of Sciences (1985); Elisabeth R. Cole Award (Founders Award), Biophysical Society (1996); Berkeley Citation, University of California (1996); Member, American Academy of Arts and Sciences (2001); Emily M. Gray Award, Biophysical Society (2006); Fellow: American Physical Society, Biophysical Society.

He died on November 15, 2016 at the age of 85.

The Biophysical Society gives the Ignacio Tinoco Award in his honor.

References

Further reading
 —Autobiographical article by Tinoco

American physical chemists
Members of the United States National Academy of Sciences
University of New Mexico alumni
University of Wisconsin–Madison College of Letters and Science alumni
Yale University fellows
UC Berkeley College of Chemistry faculty
Scientists from the San Francisco Bay Area
1931 births
2016 deaths